National Highway 167B, commonly called NH 167B is a national highway in  India. It is a spur road of National Highway 67.  NH-167B traverses the state of Andhra Pradesh in India.The tenders for phase 1 of this road project covering a road length of 40 km from singarayakonda to malakonda(local shrine of sri lakshmi narasimha swamy) have been called on june 21 2021 under Morth annual highway laying plan with a budget outlay of approximately 700crores,A bypass at Kandukur is planned to avoid outbound traffic into town. Works will begin shortly after finalisation of contract work.

Route 
Mydukuru, Onipenta, Porumamilla, Kammavaripalli, Rajasaheb Peta, Tekurpeta, Seetharamapuram, Kothapalli, Ambavaram, Ganeshunipalli, Darsi Gunta Peta, Chandrasekharapuram, Kovilampadu, Khamampadu, Bookapuram, Tumalgunta, Pamuru, Nuchupoda, Inimerla, Lakshmi Narsapuram, Mopadu, Botlagudur, Ayyavaripalli, Malakonda, Chundi Ayyavaripalli, Chundi, Valetivaripalem, Pokuru, Nukavaram, Badevaripalem,Bonthavaripalem, Cherlopalem, Kandukur, Malyadri Colony, Oguru, Kanumalla, Singarayakonda

Junctions  
 
  Terminal near Mydukuru.
  near Pamur.
  Terminal at Singarayakonda.

See also 
 List of National Highways in India by highway number
 List of National Highways in India by state

References

External links 

 NH 167B on OpenStreetMap

National highways in India
National Highways in Andhra Pradesh